The first USS McCook (DD-252) was a  in the United States Navy. Entering service in 1919, the ship had a brief active life before being placed in the reserve fleet. Reactivated for World War II, the ship was transferred to the Royal Navy and then to the Royal Canadian Navy and renamed HMCS St. Croix. Assigned as a convoy escort in the Battle of the Atlantic, St. Croix was torpedoed and sunk on 20 September 1943.

Design and description
The Clemson class were the second class of "liberty destroyers" designed and built for the United States Navy. After the entry of the US into World War I, the United States Navy immediately required many escort ships. One of the classes given the moniker "flush deck destroyers", they were basically a repeat  with increased fuel storage for greater range. They also had increased anti-submarine warfare armament in response to criticisms of the Wickes class.

The destroyers was powered by steam provided by four White-Forster boilers to a pair of Westinghouse geared turbines.

Their improved armament reflected designs by British and German navies. The Clemson class was initially armed with four 4"/50 caliber guns; one situated on the forecastle, two on the superstructure deck amidships and one on the quarterdeck. The quarterdeck gun was later moved to the aft deck superstructure to make room for depth charge roller tracks. The 4"/50 guns had limited elevation and could not fire at aircraft. A 3"/23 caliber gun was installed for anti-aircraft warfare defense, along with two .50 caliber machine guns. The mainmast was shortened to improve the field of fire for the 3-inch gun. Mk 6 and Mk 9 depth charges were equipped in US service and were deployed via the aforementioned roller tracks or "K" or "Y" guns. The destroyers also mounted twelve torpedo tubes in four triple mounts capable of firing  torpedoes. The tube mounts were sited amidships between the superstructures. The destroyers carried no spare torpedoes.

Construction and career

United States Navy service 
The destroyer was laid down on 10 September 1918 by Bethlehem Shipbuilding at their yard in Quincy, Massachusetts, with the yard number 332. Named for Roderick S. McCook, the ship was launched on 31 January 1919, sponsored by Mrs. Henry C. Dinger. McCook was commissioned on 30 April 1919.

Following a period performing shakedown training, McCook was assigned to Destroyer Force, Atlantic Fleet. She operated along the east coast of the United States until decommissioning at Philadelphia on 30 June 1922. McCook remained in the Atlantic Reserve Fleet until recommissioned on 18 December 1939. The next year McCook was designated for exchange under the Destroyers for Bases Agreement with the United Kingdom.

Transfer to the UK

By 1940, the United Kingdom and the Commonwealth nations were fighting the Axis powers alone after the fall of France. The convoy route between North America and the United Kingdom was under attack by German U-boats and required protection, but the British lacked adequate ships to defend the shipping lanes. That year, the US offered 50 "flush deck destroyers" to the UK in exchange for leases to British bases around the world. In September, the deal was sealed and 50 vessels of the Clemson and Wickes classes were transferred to the UK. Renamed the Town class by the British, their new names were chosen from towns with names common to both nations.

After entering British service, the destroyers were modified with British radar, asdic and depth charge throwers. Two of the torpedo tube mounts were removed to make space for an Oerlikon 20 mm cannon, the aft 4-inch gun was replaced by a British 12-pounder gun and Type 273 radar was installed. Two boilers were removed and fuel storage was increased to improve range. The destroyer's final layout was three 20 mm Oerlikon cannon, one 3-inch gun, two .50 caliber machine guns, depth charge roller racks, one 21-inch torpedo tube mount sited on the deck centreline and the bridge area was revamped to make room for the new electronic equipment.

Steaming to Halifax, Nova Scotia, McCook arrived on 20 September 1940. Decommissioned on 24 September by the United States Navy, the destroyer was transferred to the United Kingdom on the same date, but due to manpower shortages in the Royal Navy, she was retransferred immediately to the Royal Canadian Navy and commissioned as HMCS St. Croix (I81). Following the Canadian practice of naming destroyers after Canadian rivers (but with deference to the U.S. origin), St. Croix was named after the St. Croix River forming the border between Maine and New Brunswick.

Royal Canadian Navy service 

The destroyer sailed for the United Kingdom on 30 November via St. John's, Newfoundland but encountered a hurricane en route and was forced to return to Canada. HMCS St. Croix arrived at Halifax on 18 December and underwent repairs which kept the destroyer inactive until March 1941. On 14 March 1941 St. Croix assumed local escort and patrol duties in Canadian waters. At the end of August she joined the Newfoundland Escort Force and plied between St. John's and Reykjavík, Iceland. St. Croix underwent a six-month refit at Saint John, New Brunswick, returning to service in May 1942. By May 1942 the Newfoundland Escort Force had been renamed the Mid-Ocean Escort Force and its range extended to Londonderry Port.

On the return voyage, Convoy ON 127 was attacked by 13 U-boats. Between 10 September and 14 September eleven merchant ships and one destroyer were lost.

With the addition of air escort to convoy defense in 1943, U-boat tolls in the North Atlantic diminished and many of the boats were withdrawn during the summer. In the fall, however, Germany began a new U-boat offensive. On 16 September, St. Croix, then on her first patrol with an offensive striking group in the Bay of Biscay, went to the aid of convoy ONS 18, followed by ON 202, both heavily beset by a wolfpack. The defense of these convoys resulted in a long-running battle with losses to both sides. The convoys lost three escorts and six merchantmen, with two escorts damaged. The wolfpack lost three U-boats.

Itchen, forced to retire that evening, returned the next morning and picked up 81 survivors from St. Croix and one from Polyanthus. The following day, 22 September, Itchen herself was torpedoed. Three men were rescued, two from Itchen, one from St. Croix.

Trans-Atlantic convoys escorted

References

Sources

Further reading

External links
 USS McCook at navsource
  HMCS St Croix: a recollection by D Dunlop

 

Clemson-class destroyers
Ships of the Royal Canadian Navy
Ships built in Quincy, Massachusetts
1919 ships
Town-class destroyers converted from Clemson-class destroyers
Ships sunk by German submarines in World War II
Shipwrecks in the Bay of Biscay
World War II shipwrecks in the Atlantic Ocean
Maritime incidents in September 1943